Maria Isidorovna Goldsmith (1862–1933), also known as Marie Goldsmith, was a Russian Jewish anarchist and collaborator of Peter Kropotkin. She also wrote under the pseudonyms Maria Isidine and Maria Korn.

Early life and career 

Maria Isidorovna Goldsmith was born to Jewish and Russian ancestry in 1862 or 1863. Goldsmith's father, Isidor, was a radical publisher in St. Petersburg and her mother, Sofia, was trained in medicine. The family belonged to forbidden organizations. This evidently affected Goldsmith's childhood and mindset therein, though the former was little recorded. They fled Russia for Paris in 1884, where her father died two years later. Goldsmith received a Ph.D. in biology from the Sorbonne in 1915 and published scientific papers. She served as secretary of L'Année Biologique from 1902 to 1919, and worked closely with its editor, Yves Delage, especially after he became nearly blind in 1904. Together they published Les Théories de l'évolution and La Parthénogénèse naturelle et expérimentale. After his death in 1920, Goldsmith struggled to find stable work.

During her student years in Paris, Goldsmith joined the Etudiants socialistes révolutionnaires internationalistes (ESRI) in June 1892, an anarchist organization founded the previous December, for which she wrote brochures and was active until 1898. She became a figure of stature among Russian anarchists and had strong relationships with other Russian revolutionaries. Likely first met Emma Goldman in the late 1890s on her visit to Europe. In the early 1900s, Goldsmith attended meetings where Peter Kropotkin discussed revolutionary tactics. She wrote for a number of anarchist publications in English, French, Italian, Russian, and Yiddish throughout the rest of her life. Goldsmith most often wrote under the pen name M. Korn, though she also used the names Maria Corn and Maria Isidine. Goldsmith wrote for the Yiddish Freie Arbeiter Stimme and the London-based Khleb i Volya. The latter émigré paper shut down after November 1905 when many of its editors returned to Russia upon news of the Revolution of 1905, but as need persisted, the Listki Khleb i Volya started in London a year later, following a conference in October 1906. Goldsmith assisted with editorial work and Kropotkin, who served on its editorial board, was dedicated to its cause. The paper was largely supported by Americans and most of its circulation of three to four thousand copies went there instead of to Russia. Following the 1917 October Revolution, Goldsmith assisted with Kropotkin's Memoirs of a Revolutionist and Kropotkin described her as a collaborator. She also translated Kropotkin's Ethics from Russian to French in 1927. Her correspondence with Kropotkin, over 400 letters, is housed in the Bibliothèque Nationale of Paris, with copies at the Hoover Institution at Stanford University. Goldsmith continued to write for other anarchist papers, including the Plus Loin in the 1920s, and her apartment, which she shared with her mother, served as a meeting place for Russian anarchists in Paris. Shortly after her mother died, Goldsmith killed herself on 11 January 1933. She never naturalized as French.

Notes

References

Further reading 

 
 A history of the French anarchist movement, 1917-1945, 100, 292
 
 https://books.google.com/books?id=dh1NvIxiaIIC&pg=PA353

External links 

1871 births
1933 deaths
1933 suicides
Anarchist writers
Anarchists from the Russian Empire
Emigrants from the Russian Empire to France
French anarchists
French non-fiction writers
French political writers
French women writers
Jewish anarchists
Jewish Russian writers
Russian anarchists
Russian non-fiction writers
Russian political writers
Russian women writers
Suicides in France
University of Paris alumni
Writers from Paris